Ann Kosakowski McNamee (Southbridge, Massachusetts, May 21, 1953) is a music theorist, singer-songwriter and musical theater composer/lyricist based in San Francisco, California and a retired Professor Emerita of music at Swarthmore College notable for her contribution to music theory; her song writing; and her musical performances with the bands the Flying Other Brothers and Moonalice known for their cutting edge technology, particularly in the area of social media, as well as their performances at festivals such as Hardly Strictly Bluegrass, Nateva, Summer Camp Music Festival, Oregon Country Fair, Gathering of the Vibes; and with her band Ann Atomic during the 2010 revival of Lilith Fair. She composed the majority of the songs on the Moonalice album that was part of T Bone Burnett’s nomination for Producer of the Year at the 2009 Grammys.

Contribution to music theory 

She is the author of highly cited academic work in music theory, specifically on bitonality, mode and interval in the music of Karol Szymanowski, the role of the piano introduction in Franz Schubert's Lieder, and the octave expansion and sonata form of Grażyna Bacewicz's Second Piano Sonata.

She has been cited by Allen Forte, co-winner of the 1997 Wallace Berry Distinguished Book Award of the Society for Music Theory for her significant contribution to his 1995 book, "The American Popular Ballad of the Golden Era, 1924–1950: A Study in Musical Design.". Dave Headlam, winner of the 1997 Deems Taylor award in the Symphonic Books category of the American Society of Composers, Authors, and Publishers (ASCAP), cited her for her contribution on interval cycles in Karol Szymanowski's works, in his 1996 book "The Music of Alban Berg". Kristine H. Burns in her 2002 book, "Women and Music in America Since 1900: An Encyclopedia [Two Volumes]" cited her for her work on the music of Franz Schubert and Karol Szymanowski. She has also been cited in reviews of music in the 2004 edition of "New Historical Anthology of Music by Women" edited by James R. Briscoe.

Contribution to music's digital revolution 
McNamee is the co-writer of the Moonalice song "It's 4:20 Somewhere". The lyrics of the song were referenced in the 2011 book, "The Fall of the House of Forbes: The Inside Story of the Collapse of a Media Empire" by Stewart Pinkerton.
In August 2012 the Rock and Roll Hall of Fame announced that the digital logs for "It's 4:20 Somewhere" had been acquired for its library and archives, describing the Moonalice logs as helping to "...tell the story of music's digital revolution; specifically the rise of direct-from-artist (DFA) distribution. Moonalice is the first band without a label to achieve one million downloads of a song from its own servers, direct-from-artist. "It's 4:20 Somewhere" has been downloaded over 4.6 million times".

Contribution to musical theater 

Having retired from performing with Moonalice in October 2012 to pursue a career in musical theater, she co-wrote a musical, Love Bytes, together with Roger Love. Six of the songs from Love Bytes were performed during a public performance in October 2012. She is collaborating on a second musical, Other World, with Hunter Bell, Jeff Bowen and Wētā Workshop (Wellington, NZ), initially developing the project as part of the Johnny Mercer Writers Colony at Goodspeed Musicals in 2014. Other World was selected as the inaugural project at the 2016 Spring Space in Saratoga Springs, New York, and held its First Preview at Bucks County Playhouse on March 14, 2020. A preview of Other World was streamed as a part of the New York Theatre Barn's New Works Series on June 23, 2021. Other World began its world-premiere engagement February 24, 2022 at Delaware Theatre Company co-starring Bonnie Milligan, with performances through March 20, 2022. The production won best New Play or Musical at the Broadway World awards for Delaware 2022.

Personal 
She has a B.A. in Music from Wellesley (1975) and a PhD in Music Theory from Yale University (1980). She has been married to the venture capitalist Roger McNamee since 1983 and, with her husband, is a co-founder of the Haight Street Art Center, which will be run as a co-op for artists, and will include a fine art print shop as well as exhibition space.

Along with Jack Markell, former Governor of Delaware, created “Charlottesville,” a song celebrating the life of Heather Heyer, and “The Silence of the Good,” featuring Dr. Clarence B. Jones, which includes the lyric, “As history has taught us, the Reverend understood, the bad get their power from the silence of the good.” This song is inspired by Dr. Martin Luther King Jr.'s The Letter from Birmingham Jail, where the civil rights leader was detained after a rally in 1963.

Discography 

2012 Let's Start from Here
2012 No End to Love
2011 The Rest of the Words
2011 It's 4–20 Somewhere
2010 Wherever These Words Land
2008 Blink of An Eye Produced by T-Bone Burnett
2007 Cracks in the Sidewalk Produced by G.E. Smith
2005 Complicated Eyes Produced by G.E. Smith
2003 Crazy in Heaven Produced by G.E. Smith
2000 Space in Your Arms

References

External links 

 www.annmcnamee.com 
 https://otherworldmusical.com/

Request for a new review 

American women singer-songwriters
Living people
People from Southbridge, Massachusetts
1953 births
American indie rock musicians
Swarthmore College faculty
American women academics
21st-century American women
Singer-songwriters from Massachusetts
Moonalice members
Flying Other Brothers members